Michael Vescera is an American heavy metal singer for various bands and projects like Loudness (Soldier of Fortune, On the Prowl, Live at the Budokan), Obsession
(Marshall Law, Scarred for Life, Methods of Madness, Carnival of Lies, Order of Chaos), Yngwie Malmsteen (The Seventh Sign, Magnum Opus), Dr. Sin (Dr. Sin II), Roland Grapow (Kaleidoscope) or his own band MVP (Mike Vescera Project).

Besides being a vocalist, Vescera also works as a record producer: his recent collaborations include artists such as Metal Mike Chlasiak and Bobby Jarzombek (Halford, Sebastian Bach, Fates warning) and their soon to be released Pain Museum album, Bobby Blotzer's (Ratt) & John Corabi's (Mötley Crüe, The Scream) Twenty4Seven CD, Magnitude Nine's forthcoming album Decoding the Soul, Reign of Terror (featuring Joe Stump) and Killing Machine (featuring Stet Howland and Mike Duda of W.A.S.P.) – just to name a few. Michael has his studio "The Toy Room" in Nashville Tennessee as well as a satellite studio "Toy Room North" in Milford, Connecticut.

Vescera covered "Get a Life" by Siam Shade for the 2010 tribute album, Siam Shade Tribute. In mid-2011, while also continuing with his band OBSESSION, Mike joined (ANIMETAL USA) (Sony Music), playing heavy metal versions of Japanese Anime theme songs. (Following in the steps of the Japanese project Animetal.) This project features Rudy Sarzo on bass, Scott Travis on drums (Later Jon Dette on Drums), and Chris Impelliterri on guitar. In 2012, he collaborated with Sovereign's guitar player Samir Mhamdi performing all the vocals on the album Warring Heaven.

In mid 2016, in a spin off of the Animetal USA project, Vescera with Rudy Sarzo on bass, John Bruno (Obsession) on guitar, and BJ Zampa (House of Lords) on drums, recorded a new project.  This project D-Metal Stars "Metal Disney" was released in October 2016 on Walt Disney Records in the Japanese market. It reached No. 3 on the Amazon Japan Hard Rock / Metal Best Sellers chart, and No. 2 on the Children's Chart. The album was then released for the US Market on March 31, 2017, by UMG, Universal Music Group landing on the Billboard, iTunes, and Amazon charts.

In 2018, Vescera produced, arranged, and played keyboards for a rock guitar project called "Disney Super Guitar" (titled "Super Guitar Disney" in Japanese market).  Along with D-Metal Stars bandmates John Bruno (guitar) and BJ Zampa (drums), Vescera brought in his brother Chris Vescera to play Bass for the project.  This is an instrumental release featuring a guest lead guitarist on each song. Featuring Zakk Wylde, Paul Gilbert, George Lynch, Richie Kotzen, Orianthi, Ron Thal, Mike Orlando, Phil X, Jeff Watson, and Tak Matsumoto. Super Guitar Disney became a No. 1 Best Seller on the Amazon Japan Anime Chart, and No. 3 Best Seller on Amazon Japan Rock Chart.

Mid-2018, Michael launched a new project called "AniMaze X". This is a project started by the members of D-Metal Stars that encompasses a wider variety of music themes such as superheros, popular cartoons, Broadway musicals and movie soundtracks all played in the Metal style. Live Metal performance with a theatrical style production.

Discography

References 

 "Biography: Loudness" Allmusic Retrieved 12 June 2010
 "Encyclopaedia Metallum"
 "Rolling Stone Magazine"
 "Perez Hilton"
 "Inquisitr"
 "Metal Sucks"
 "Konbini"
 "Hello Giggles"
 "Maximum Metal"

External links 
DURP E-Zine Interview

American male singers
American heavy metal singers
Loudness (band) members
Living people
1960 births
Animetal USA members
Dr. Sin members
Yngwie J. Malmsteen's Rising Force members
Domo Records artists